Melicope is a genus of about 240 species of shrubs and trees in the family Rutaceae, occurring from the Hawaiian Islands across the Pacific Ocean to tropical Asia, Australia and New Zealand. Plants in the genus Melicope have simple or trifoliate leaves arranged in opposite pairs, flowers arranged in panicles, with four sepals, four petals and four or eight stamens and fruit composed of up to four follicles.

Description
Plants in the genus Melicope have simple or trifoliate leaves arranged in opposite pairs, or sometimes whorled. The flowers are arranged in panicles and are bisexual or sometimes with functionally male- or female-only flowers. The flowers have four sepals, four petals and four or eight stamens. There are four, sometimes five, carpels fused at the base with fused styles, the stigma similar to the tip of the style. The fruit is composed of up to four follicles fused at the base, each with one or two seeds.

Taxonomy
The genus Melicope was first formally described in 1775 by Johann Reinhold Forster and his son Georg Forster in their book Characteres Generum Plantarum and the first species they described (the type species) was Melicope ternata.

The generic name Melicope is derived from Greek words μελι (meli), meaning "honey," and κοπη (kope), meaning "a division," referring to the glands at the base of the ovary. The 2009 Takhtajan system placed the genus in the subfamily Rutoideae, tribe Zanthoxyleae. A 2021 subfamily classification of the Rutaceae, based both on a new and previous molecular phylogenetic studies, places Melicope (with an expanded circumscription) in the subfamily Zanthoxyloideae, stating that the evidence does not yet support classification to tribal level.

Evidence from 2007 onwards showed that with its traditional circumscription, Melicope was not monophyletic. The previously separated genus Platydesma of four species is nested within the genus Melicope and is sister to all Hawaiian Melicope species. And while Melicope species are usually dioecious (individual plants only bear either male or female flowers), the flowers of the former Platydesma are hermaphroditic, suggesting a rare evolutionary reversion away from dioecy in Platydesma. Molecular phylogenetic analyses also suggest that the genera Comptonella, Dutaillyea, Picrella, and possibly Dutailliopsis, all from New Caledonia, might also be nested in Melicope, although they are accepted in the 2021 classification, as is the temperate Asian genus Tetradium, which has sometimes been merged into Melicope (possibly including the tropical Euodia).

Ecology
Melicopes are foodplants for various animals, mainly invertebrates. Caterpillars of the Ulysses butterfly (Papilio ulysses) are fond of M. elleryana. Caterpillars of Thyrocopa moths have been found on M. clusiifolia. The larvae of some belid weevils from the genus Proterhinus also feed on Melicope although they prefer unhealthy, dying or dead specimens. The plants of some species may not be safe for humans. The nectar of wharangi (M. ternata) is known to yield toxic honey that may kill whoever eats it.

Conservation
Several of the Hawaiian species are listed as "endangered" by the Government of the United States of America, due to habitat loss and competition from invasive non-native plants. A few species are already extinct.

Species list
The following is a list of species accepted by the Plants of the World Online as at July 2020:

 Melicope aberrans T.G.Hartley – New Guinea (N.G.)
 Melicope accedens (Blume) T.G.Hartley – tropical Asia
 Melicope acuminata (Merr.) T.G.Hartley
 Melicope adscendens (H.St.John & Hume) T.G.Hartley & B.C.Stone - Hawaii
 Melicope aequata T.G.Hartley – N.G.
 Melicope affinis T.G.Hartley – Queensland (Qld.)
 Melicope alba Lauterb. – N.G.
 Melicope albiflora (Rech.) T.G.Hartley – Samoa
 Melicope alpestris T.G.Hartley – Philippines
 Melicope aneura (Lauterb.) T.G.Hartley – N.G.
 Melicope anisata (H.Mann) T.G.Hartley & B.C.Stone mokihana – Hawaii (?)
 Melicope anomala (Lauterb.) T.G.Hartley – N.G.
 Melicope bakeri T.G.Hartley – Madagascar
 Melicope balankazo (H.Perrier) T.G.Hartley
 Melicope balansae Guillaumin – New Caledonia (N.C.)
 Melicope balgooyi Appelhans, W.L.Wagner & K.R.Wood – Tubuai
 Melicope balloui (Rock) T.G.Hartley & B.C.Stone rock pelea – Hawaii
 Melicope barbigera A.Gray – Hawaii
 Melicope belahe (Baill.) T.G.Hartley
 Melicope benguetensis (Elmer) T.G.Hartley
 Melicope blancoi T.G.Hartley – Philippines
 Melicope bonwickii (F.Muell.) T.G.Hartley – Java, Borneo, the Philippines, N.G., Qld.
 Melicope borbonica (Bory) T.G.Hartley bois de catafaille blanc – Réunion
 Melicope boweriana (Christoph.) T.G.Hartley – Samoa
 Melicope bracteata (Nadeaud) S.L.Welsh – Cook Islands, Tubuai, Society Islands
 Melicope brassii T.G.Hartley – N.G.
 Melicope broadbentiana F.M.Bailey – Qld.
 Melicope buennemeijeri T.G.Hartley – Sumatra
 Melicope burmahia (Raizada & K.Naray.) T.G.Hartley – Myanmar
 Melicope burttiana B.C.Stone – Solomon Islands, Santa Cruz Island
 Melicope buwaldae T.G.Hartley – Sumatra
 Melicope calycina T.G.Hartley – Lesser Sunda Islands
 Melicope capillacea (Gillespie) A.C.Sm. – Fiji
 Melicope carrii T.G.Hartley – N.G.
 Melicope celebica T.G.Hartley – Sulawesi
 Melicope chapelieri (Baill.) T.G.Hartley – Mauritius
 Melicope christophersenii (H.St.John) T.G.Hartley & B.C.Stone – Hawaii
 Melicope chunii (Merr.) T.G.Hartley – Hainan
 Melicope cinerea A.Gray  – Hawaii
 Melicope clemensiae T.G.Hartley – Borneo
 Melicope clusiifolia (A.Gray) T.G.Hartley & B.C.Stone – Hawaii
 Melicope confusa (Merr.) Tang S.Liu – tropical Asia
 Melicope conjuga T.G.Hartley – N.G. to Bismarck Archipelago
 Melicope contermina C.Moore & F.Muell. – Lord Howe Island
 Melicope coodeana  T.G.Hartley – Réunion
 Melicope corneri T.G.Hartley – Peninsula Malaysia
 Melicope cornuta (Hillebr.) Appelhans, K.R.Wood & W.L.Wagner – Hawaii
 Melicope crassifolia (Merr.) T.G.Hartley – Vietnam
 Melicope crassiramis (K.Schum.) T.G.Hartley
 Melicope cravenii T.G.Hartley – N.G.
 Melicope crispula (Merr. & L.M.Perry) T.G.Hartley
 Melicope cruciata (A.Heller) T.G.Hartley & B.C.Stone cross-bearing pelea (extinct) – Hawaii
 Melicope cucullata (Gillespie) A.C.Sm. – Fiji
 Melicope degeneri (B.C.Stone) T.G.Hartley & B.C.Stone – Hawaii
 Melicope denhamii (Seem.) T.G.Hartley – N.G., Vanuatu, Santa Cruz Island
 Melicope dicksoniana T.G.Hartley – N.G.
 Melicope discolor (Baker) T.G.Hartley
 Melicope doormani-montis (Lauterb.) T.G.Hartley
 Melicope dubia (Merr.) T.G.Hartley
 Melicope durifolia (K.Schum.) T.G.Hartley – N.G.
 Melicope elleryana (F.Muell.) T.G.Hartley – N.G., Solomon Islands, Santa Cruz Island, Qld.
 Melicope elliptica A.Gray – Hawaii
 Melicope eriophylla (Merr. & L.M.Perry) T.G.Hartley
 Melicope erromangensis T.G.Hartley – Vanuatu
 Melicope euneura (Miq.) T.G.Hartley
 Melicope evanensis (A.C.Sm.) A.C.Sm. – Fiji
 Melicope exuta T.G.Hartley – N.G.
 Melicope fatraina (H.Perrier) T.G.Hartley
 Melicope fatuhivensis (F.Br.) T.G.Hartley & B.C.Stone – Marquesas Islands
 Melicope feddei (H.Lév.) T.G.Hartley & B.C.Stone – Hawaii
 Melicope fellii T.G.Hartley – Qld.
 Melicope flaviflora A.C.Sm. – Fiji
 Melicope floribunda (Baker) T.G.Hartley
 Melicope forbesii (Baker f.) T.G.Hartley – Santa Cruz Island
 Melicope frutescens (Blanco) Appelhans & J.Wen
 Melicope fulva (Guillaumin) B.C.Stone – N.C.
 Melicope glabella T.G.Hartley – Philippines
 Melicope glaberrima Guillaumin  – N.C.
 Melicope glabra (Blume) T.G.Hartley – Malaysia, Andaman and Nicobar Islands
 Melicope glomerata (Craib) T.G.Hartley – Mainland Southeast Asia
 Melicope goilalensis T.G.Hartley – N.G.
 Melicope grisea (Planch.) T.G.Hartley – Bonin Islands to Volcano Islands
 Melicope haleakalae (B.C.Stone) T.G.Hartley & B.C.Stone Maui ruta tree (extinct) – Hawaii
 Melicope haupuensis (H.St.John) T.G.Hartley & B.C.Stone – Hawaii
 Melicope hawaiensis (Wawra) T.G.Hartley & B.C.Stone – Hawaii
 Melicope hayesii T.G.Hartley – Qld., New South Wales (N.S.W.)
 Melicope hiepkoi T.G.Hartley – N.G.
 Melicope hiiakae (B.C.Stone) T.G.Hartley & B.C.Stone – Hawaii
 Melicope hivaoaensis J.Florence – Marquesas
 Melicope homeophylla A.C.Sm. – Fiji
 Melicope hookeri T.G.Hartley
 Melicope hosakae (H.St.John) W.L.Wagner & R.K.Shannon – Hawaii
 Melicope idiocarpa T.G.Hartley – Sulawesi
 Melicope improvisa T.G.Hartley – N.G.
 Melicope incana T.G.Hartley – Sumatra, Borneo, Sulawesi
 Melicope indica Wight
 Melicope inopinata J.Florence – Marquesas
 Melicope irifica (Coode) T.G.Hartley – Réunion
 Melicope jonesii T.G.Hartley – Qld.
 Melicope jugosa T.G.Hartley – Borneo
 Melicope kaalaensis (H.St.John) T.G.Hartley & B.C.Stone – Hawaii
 Melicope kainantuensis T.G.Hartley – N.G.
 Melicope kavaiensis (H.Mann) T.G.Hartley & B.C.Stone – Hawaii
 Melicope kjellbergii T.G.Hartley – Sulawesi
 Melicope knudsenii (Hillebr.) T.G.Hartley & B.C.Stone Knudsen's melicope  – Hawaii
 Melicope kostermansii T.G.Hartley – Maluku Islands to N.G.
 Melicope laevis T.G.Hartley – Vanuatu
 Melicope lamii Lauterb. – N.G.
 Melicope lasioneura (Baill.) Baill. ex Guillaumin
 Melicope latifolia (DC.) T.G.Hartley – Malaysia, Lesser Sunda Island, Myanmar, Samoa, Santa Cruz Island
 Melicope lauterbachii T.G.Hartley
 Melicope laxa (Elmer)T.G.Hartley
 Melicope leptococca Guillaumin – N.C.
 Melicope littoralis (Endl.) T.G.Hartley ex P.S.Green – Norfolk Island
 Melicope lobocarpa (F.Muell.) T.G.Hartley
 Melicope longior T.G.Hartley – Bismarck Archipelago
 Melicope lucida (A.Gray) A.C.Sm. – Pacific Islands
 Melicope lunu-ankenda (Gaertn.) T.G.Hartley – Tibet, tropical Asia
 Melicope lydgatei (Hillebr.) T.G.Hartley & B.C.Stone - Hawaii
 Melicope macgregorii T.G.Hartley – N.G.
 Melicope macrocarpa (King) T.G.Hartley – Malaysia
 Melicope macrophylla Merr. & L.M.Perry – N.G.
 Melicope macropus (Hillebr.) T.G.Hartley & B.C.Stone – Hawaii
 Melicope madagascariensis (Baker) T.G.Hartley – Madagascar
 Melicope magnifolia (Baill.) T.G.Hartley
 Melicope makahae (B.C.Stone) T.G.Hartley & B.C.Stone – Hawaii
 Melicope maliliensis T.G.Hartley – Sulawesi
 Melicope margaretae (F.Br.) T.G.Hartley – Tuamotus
 Melicope maxii T.G.Hartley – Sulawesi
 Melicope megastigma T.G.Hartley – Maluku Islands
 Melicope micrococca (F.Muell.) T.G.Hartley white euodia – Qld., N.S.W.
 Melicope mindorensis T.G.Hartley – Philippines
 Melicope molokaiensis (Hillebr.) T.G.Hartley & B.C.Stone – Hawaii
 Melicope moluccana T.G.Hartley – Maluku Islands
 Melicope montana Baker f. – N.C.
 Melicope monticola T.G.Hartley
 Melicope mucronata Merr. & L.M.Perry – N.G.
 Melicope mucronulata (H.St.John) T.G.Hartley & B.C.Stone – Hawaii
 Melicope munroi (H.St.John) T.G.Hartley & B.C.Stone – Hawaii
 Melicope nealae (B.C.Stone) T.G.Hartley & B.C.Stone – Hawaii
 Melicope neglecta T.G.Hartley – Java to Lesser Sunda Islands
 Melicope nishimurae (Koidz.) T.Yamaz. – Bonin Islands
 Melicope novoguineensis Valeton – N.G.
 Melicope nubicola T.G.Hartley – Solomon Islands
 Melicope nukuhivensis (F.Br.) T.G.Hartley & B.C.Stone – Marquesas
 Melicope oahuensis (H.Lév.) T.G.Hartley & B.C.Stone – Hawaii
 Melicope oblanceolata T.G.Hartley – N.G.
 Melicope obovata (H.St.John) T.G.Hartley & B.C.Stone obovate melicope (extinct) – Hawaii
 Melicope obscura (Cordem.) T.G.Hartley – Réunion
 Melicope obtusifolia (DC.) T.G.Hartley gros catafaille – Mauritius
 Melicope oppenheimeri K.R.Wood, Appelhans & W.L.Wagner
 Melicope orbicularis (Hillebr.) T.G.Hartley & B.C.Stone orbicular pelea – Hawaii
 Melicope ovalis (H.St.John) T.G.Hartley & B.C.Stone wild pelea – Hawaii
 Melicope ovata (H.St.John & E.P.Hume) T.G.Hartley & B.C.Stone – Hawaii
 Melicope pachyphylla (King) T.G.Hartley – Malaysia
 Melicope pachypoda (Lauterb.) T.G.Hartley
 Melicope pahangensis T.G.Hartley – Laos
 Melicope palawensis (Lauterb.) T.G.Hartley – Philippines
 Melicope pallida (Hillebr.) T.G.Hartley & B.C.Stone – Hawaii
 Melicope paniculata (H.St.John) T.G.Hartley & B.C.Stone Lihue ruta tree  – Hawaii
 Melicope papuana (Lauterb.) Lauterb. – N.G.
 Melicope patulinervia (Merr. & Chun) C.C.Huang – Hainan
 Melicope pauciflora T.G.Hartley – Sulawesi
 Melicope pedicellata T.G.Hartley – N.C.
 Melicope peduncularis (H.Lév.) T.G.Hartley & B.C.Stone – Hawaii
 Melicope pendula T.G.Hartley – Solomon Islands
 Melicope peninsularis T.G.Hartley – Qld.
 Melicope pergamentacea (Elmer) T.G.Hartley
 Melicope perlmanii J.Florence – Marquesas
 Melicope perryae T.G.Hartley – N.G.
 Melicope petiolaris T.G.Hartley – N.G.
 Melicope phanerophlebia (Merr. & L.M.Perry) T.G.Hartley
 Melicope polydenia Merr. & L.M.Perry – N.G.
 Melicope polybotrya (C.Moore & F.Muell.) T.G.Hartley ex P.S.Green Lord Howe Island
 Melicope ponapensis Lauterb. – Caroline Islands
 Melicope pseudoanisata (Rock) T.G.Hartley & B.C.Stone – Hawaii
 Melicope pteleifolia (Champ. ex Benth.) T.G.Hartley – southern China to Indochina, Taiwan
 Melicope puberula (H.St.John) T.G.Hartley & B.C.Stone – Hawaii
 Melicope pubifolia Merr. & L.M.Perry – N.G.
 Melicope pulgarensis (Elmer) T.G.Hartley
 Melicope quadrangularis (H.St.John & E.P.Hume) T.G.Hartley & B.C.Stone four-angled pelea – Hawaii
 Melicope quadrilocularis (Hook. & Arn.) T.G.Hartley – Bonin Islands
 Melicope radiata (H.St.John) T.G.Hartley & B.C.Stone – Hawaii
 Melicope ramuliflora T.G.Hartley – Sumatra
 Melicope reflexa (H.St.John) T.G.Hartley & B.C.Stone – Hawaii
 Melicope remyi (Sherff) Appelhans, K.R.Wood & W.L.Wagner – Hawaii
 Melicope reticulata Lauterb. – N.G.
 Melicope retusa (A.Gray) T.G.Hartley – southwest Pacific
 Melicope revoluta J.Florence – Marquesas
 Melicope rhytidocarpa (Merr. & L.M.Perry) T.G.Hartley
 Melicope richii {A.Gray) T.G.Hartley – Samoa
 Melicope ridsdalei T.G.Hartley – N.G.
 Melicope rigoensis T.G.Hartley – N.G.
 Melicope robbinsii T.G.Hartley – N.G.
 Melicope robusta A.C.Sm. – Fiji
 Melicope rostrata (Hillebr.) Appelhans, K.R.Wood & W.L.Wagner  – Hawaii
 Melicope rotundifolia (A.Gray) T.G.Hartley & B.C.Stone – Hawaii
 Melicope rubra (K.Schum. & Lauterb.) T.G.Hartley – N.G., Qld.
 Melicope saint-johnii (E.P.Hume) T.G.Hartley & B.C.Stone St John's pelea  – Hawaii
 Melicope sambiranensis (H.Perrier) T.G.Hartley
 Melicope sandwicensis (Hook. & Arn.) T.G.Hartley & B.C.Stone – Hawaii
 Melicope savaiensis T.G.Hartley – Samoa
 Melicope schraderi (Lauterb.) T.G.Hartley
 Melicope seemannii (Gillespie) A.C.Sm. – Fiji, Tonga
 Melicope segregis (Cordem.) T.G.Hartley – Réunion
 Melicope semecarpifolia (Merr.) T.G.Hartley – Taiwan to Philippines
 Melicope sessilifolia (Merr.) T.G.Hartley
 Melicope sessilis (H.Lév.) T.G.Hartley & B.C.Stone – Hawaii
 Melicope simplex A.Cunn. poataniwha – New Zealand
 Melicope sororia T.G.Hartley – Borneo
 Melicope spathulata A.Gray – Hawaii
 Melicope steenisii T.G.Hartley – Sumatra
 Melicope stellulata T.G.Hartley – N.G.
 Melicope sterrophylla Merr. & L.M.Perry – N.G.
 Melicope stonei K.R.Wood, Appelhans & W.L.Wagner – Hawaii
 Melicope suberosa B.C.Stone – Peninsula Malaysia
 Melicope subunifoliolata (Stapf) T.G.Hartley
 Melicope sudestica T.G.Hartley – N.G.
 Melicope sulcata T.G.Hartley – Samoa
 Melicope tahitensis Nadeaud – Society Island, N.C.
 Melicope taveuniensis A.C.Sm. – Fiji
 Melicope tekaoensis T.G.Hartley – Marquesas
 Melicope ternata J.R.Forst. & G.Forst. wharangi – New Zealand
 Melicope timorensis T.G.Hartley – Lesser Sunda Islands
 Melicope trachycarpa Lauterb. – N.G.
 Melicope trichantha (Lauterb.) T.G.Hartley
 Melicope trichopetala (Lauterb.) T.G.Hartley
 Melicope triphylla (Lam.) Merr. – Indo-China to Ryukyu Islands and SW. Pacific
 Melicope tsaratananensis (Capuron) T.G.Hartley
 Melicope vatiana (Setch.) T.G.Hartley – Samoa
 Melicope versteeghii T.G.Hartley – N.G.
 Melicope vieillardii (Baill.) Guillaumin – N.C.
 Melicope villosa (Merr.) T.G.Hartley
 Melicope vinkii T.G.Hartley – N.G.
 Melicope viticina (Wall. ex Kurz) T.G.Hartley – Yunan to Indo-China
 Melicope vitiflora (F.Muell.) T.G.Hartley – N.G., Qld., N.S.W.
 Melicope volcanica (A.Gray) T.G.Hartley & B.C.Stone  – Hawaii
 Melicope waialealae (Wawra) T.G.Hartley & B.C.Stone  – Hawaii
 Melicope wailauensis (H.St.John) T.G.Hartley & B.C.Stone  – Hawaii
 Melicope wawraeana (Rock) T.G.Hartley & B.C.Stone  – Hawaii
 Melicope woitapensis T.G.Hartley – N.G.
 Melicope xanthoxyloides (F.Muell.) T.G.Hartley – Qld., N.G.
 Melicope zahlbruckneri (Rock) T.G.Hartley & B.C.Stone Zahlbruckner's melicope
 Melicope zambalensis (Elmer) T.G.Hartley

References

External links
  (1983): Flora Apcola Tropical [in Spanish]. Editorial Tecnolgico de Costa Rica, Cartago, Costa Rica.
  (1989): Reduction of Pelea with new combinations in Melicope (Rutaceae). Taxon 38(1): 119–123. First page image

 
Taxa named by Georg Forster
Taxa named by Johann Reinhold Forster
Dioecious plants
Zanthoxyloideae genera